The handball tournaments at the 2024 Summer Olympics in Paris, France will be held from 25 July to 11 August 2024. Preliminary pool matches will occur at South Paris Arena 6, with the final phase staged at Pierre Mauroy Stadium in Lille. The format remains the same since 2000 for the men and 2008 for the women, as twelve teams in two groups battle each other in the round robin, followed by the knockout matches for the top eight starting with the quarterfinals and ending with the final and bronze match.

Events
Two sets of medals will be awarded in the following events:
 Men's handball (12 teams)
 Women's handball (12 teams)

Qualification
The National Olympic Committees might enter only one 14-player men's team and only one 14-player women's team.

Men's qualification

Women's qualification

Medal summary

Events

See also
Handball at the 2022 Asian Games
Handball at the 2023 Pan American Games

References

 
2024
2024 Summer Olympics events
Olympics
International handball competitions hosted by France